The second 1959 Major League Baseball All-Star Game was the 27th edition of the midsummer classic between the all-stars of the American League (AL) and National League (NL), the two leagues composing Major League Baseball. It was played on Monday, August 3, at the Los Angeles Memorial Coliseum in Los Angeles, California, home of the Los Angeles Dodgers of the NL, and was a 5–3 victory for the American League. This was the second of two All-Star Games played in 1959, the first was on Tuesday, July 7, in Pittsburgh, Pennsylvania, also an NL city.

The first Midsummer Classic held on the West Coast, it was also the first of only two All-Star Games not played in July; the other was in 1981 following a lengthy players' strike.

Rosters
Players in italics have since been inducted into the National Baseball Hall of Fame.

American League

National League

-x – Injured and could not play
-y – Injury replacement

Game
Umpires: Bill Jackowski, Home Plate (NL); Charlie Berry, First Base (AL); Tony Venzon, Second Base (NL); Bill Summers Third Base (AL); Ken Burkhart, Left Field (NL); Hank Soar, Right Field (AL)

Starting Lineups

Game Summary

References

External links
Baseball Almanac

Major League Baseball All-Star Game
Major League Baseball All-Star Game
Baseball competitions in Los Angeles
Major League Baseball All Star Game
August 1959 sports events in the United States
1959 in sports in California